Common names: Turan blunt-nosed viper.

Macrovipera lebetinus turanica is a venomous viper subspecies endemic to Asia.

Description
The dorsal color pattern consists of a dark ground color with a lighter, orange zigzag pattern. The supraoculars are usually semidivided.

Geographic range
It is found in eastern Turkmenistan, Uzbekistan, Tajikistan, southwestern Kazakhstan, and parts of northern Afghanistan and western Pakistan.

Venom
Not much is known about its venom but it contains procoagulants (fibrinogenases) and likely contains myotoxins. It's also possible that it contains hemorrhagins and cytotoxins. The average venom yield per bite is somewhere between 31–63 mg (dry weight). It has been known to have caused death in adult humans, and although the envenoming rate is unknown, it is suspected to be high. Symptoms of envenomation include variable non-specific effects which may include headache, nausea, vomiting, abdominal pain, diarrhea, dizziness, collapse, or convulsions. There are also marked local effects including pain, severe swelling, bruising, blistering, and moderate to severe necrosis. Other effects include moderate to severe coagulopathy and hemorrhagins causing extensive bleeding.

References

Further reading

 Golay P, Smith HM, Broadley DG, Dixon JR, McCarthy CJ, Rage J-C, Schätti B, Toriba M. 1993. Endoglyphs and Other Major Venomous Snakes of the World: A Checklist. Geneva: Azemiops Herpetological Data Center. 478 pp.
 Obst FJ. 1983. Zur Kenntnis der Schlangengattung Vipera. Zool. Abh. staatl. Mus. Tierkunde Dresden 38: 229-235.
 Terentiev PV, Chernov SA. 1940. [A Field Guide to Amphibians and Reptiles of the USSR, Second Revised and Enlarged Edition]. Leningrad: Uchpedgiz. (in Russian).

External links

 
 . Accessed 9 September 2007.

Viperinae
Reptiles of Pakistan